Magic Pocket (established 2002 in Trondheim, Norway) is a Norwegian jazz band initiated by students on the Jazz program at Trondheim Musikkonsevatorium.

Career 
Magic Pocket is a Brass Band in miniature, performing music in the open area between jazz, rock, world and contemporary music. The quartet was included in the launch contest «JazzIntro» 2004, and contributed on the festivals Nattjazz, Dølajazz and Moldejazz. Magic Pocket was awarded «JazZtipendiat» in 2009/2010. This scholarship, which is awarded by «Midtnorsk Jazzsenter», Moldejazz and Sparebank 1, amounts  Norwegian kroner and gives the recipient the opportunity to write a piece commissioned to Trondheim Jazz Orchestra performed at Moldejazz the year after. The album The Katabatic Wind (2011), where they are reinforced by the guest keyboardist Morten Qvenild (known from bands like «In the Country», «Susanna and the Magical Orchestra»), is the quartet's first and so far (2013) only release beside the recording of the commissioned work Kinetic Music (2011).

Personnel 
Hayden Powell - trumpet
Erik Johannessen - trombone
Daniel Herskedal - tuba
Erik Nylander - drums

Honors 
2004: «JazzIntro» finalist
2009: «JazZtipendiat»

Discography 
2011: The Katabatic Wind (Bolage Records), feat. Morten Qvenild
2011: Kinetic Music (MNJ Records), feat. Trondheim Jazz Orchestra

References 

Norwegian jazz ensembles
Norwegian experimental musical groups
Musical groups established in 2002
2002 establishments in Norway
Musical groups from Trondheim